The Campeonato Maranhense Second Division  is the second tier of football league of the state of Maranhão, Brazil.

Participants
2022 edition

List of champions

Notes

Titles by team 

Teams in bold still active.

By city

References

Maranhão